David Faulkner may refer to: 

 Daniel Faulkner (1955–1981), American police officer for whose murder Mumia Abu-Jamal was convicted; sometimes referred to as David Faulkner
 Dave Faulkner (musician) (born 1957), Australian rock musician
 David Faulkner (civil servant) (1934–2020), British criminologist
 David Faulkner (field hockey) (born 1963), British field hockey player
 David Faulkner (footballer) (born 1975), English footballer
 David Faulkner (judoka), American judoka
 David Faulkner, British Liberal Democrat and former leader of Newcastle City Council

See also 
 Sir David Falconer (1640–1685), Scottish judge
 David Falconer, 3rd Lord Falconer of Halkerton (1668–1724)
 David Falconer, 4th Lord Falconer of Halkerton (1681–1751)
 Faulkner (surname)